The 1949 All-Ireland Senior Football Championship was the 63rd staging of Ireland's premier Gaelic football knock-out competition.

Meath won their first title. Ending Cavan's bid for 3 in a row.

Results

Connacht Senior Football Championship

Leinster Senior Football Championship

Munster Senior Football Championship

Ulster Senior Football Championship

All-Ireland Senior Football Championship

Championship statistics

Miscellaneous

 Clare beat Kerry for the first time ever.
 For the second time in history Meath had played Louth 3 times it previously happened in 1919.
 The All Ireland semi-final between Meath and Mayo was their first championship meeting.
 Meath are All Ireland Champions for the first time.

References

All-Ireland Senior Football Championship